Daniel Pearce, better known as Eats Everything, is an English DJ and record producer. He came to prominence in 2011 with the release of "Entrance Song" on Pets Recordings. Since then, he has received critical acclaim for a number of solo releases on Dirtybird, Hypercolour and Futureboogie.

His productions combine house music with a wide range of other genres such as UK bass, garage, techno and jungle.

Musical career

Early career
Dan began his DJ career at Infamous/Heresy at club Loco Bristol, and was soon permanently placed as a resident for the Bristol night Ripsnorter then Scream in the early 2000s, as well as playing some gigs in Europe. 2010 saw early releases and remixes on independent labels including Venga Digital and Wearhouse Music. It was not until 2011, when ‘Entrance Song’ was signed to Pets Recordings, followed soon after by a release on Claude Von Stroke's Dirtybird label that Dan's career as a DJ began to gain momentum.

As a DJ
Since 2011, Dan has played at a number of the world's biggest clubbing institutions such as Fabric, DC10, Amnesia, The Warehouse Project, Space and Watergate, as well as festivals like Glastonbury, Bestival, Creamfields and Secret Garden Party. He has received support from BBC Radio 1’s Pete Tong, who has asked him to do three Essential Mixes since 2011, the most recent of which was a live recording of Pete and Dan b2b at The Warehouse Project in 2013.

In 2014, Dan was booked to be the first ever resident at XOYO in London. The three-month residency saw him play every Saturday for 12 weeks. Dan has also received a number of accolades as a DJ. In 2012 he won ‘Best British DJ’ in the DJ Magazine ‘Best of British Awards’. In addition to this, in December 2012 he was the highest new entry in Resident Advisor's prestigious ‘Top 100 DJs Poll’ coming in at number 13.

As a producer
Dan has had a string of critically acclaimed releases on Pets Recordings, Dirtybird, Hypercolour, Futureboogie and Crosstown Rebels. He has also released remixes for a broad selection of labels, giving his distinctive take on tracks by the likes of Adam F, Jamie Jones, Totally Enormous Extinct Dinosaurs, Chicken Lips, X-Press 2, The Streets and Four Tet.

He has also collaborated in the studio with the likes of Catz 'n Dogz under the name Catz Eats Dogz, Totally Enormous Extinct Dinosaurs, Justin Martin, Skream and Lukas as well as the singer/songwriter Sinead Harnett.

In 2011, Dan was awarded ‘Best Breakthrough Producer’ in DJ Magazine's ‘Best of British Award’. At Disclosure's Alexandra Palace sets in early December 2015, Eats Everything provided the opening act.

Discography

Extended plays
2011: Entrance Song [Pets]
2011: Eats Everything [Dirtybird]
2012: Vertigo / Trubble [Dirtybird]
2012: Jagged Elbow [Pets]
2012: Slow For Me [Futureboogie]
2013: Early Bites [Southern Fried Records]
2014: Reworks [Pets]

Singles

As solo artist
2020: Honey [FFRR]

Collaborations
2011: Worthy and Eats Everything - Tric Trac [Dirtybird]
2012: Idiotproof and Eats Everything - African Love EP [Jackmode Music]
2013: Teed and Eats Everything - Lion, The Lion [Crosstown Rebels]
2013: Justin Martin and Eats Everything - Feather Flight [Hypercolour]
2013: Justin Martin and Eats Everything - The Gettup [Dirtybird]
2013: Catz Eats Dogz - Stinky Lollipop EP [Pets]
2015: Eats Everything featuring Tiga and Audion - Dancing (Again!) [Method White]
2016: Big Discs EP [Pets]
2020: Fatboy Slim and Eats Everything - All The Ladies [Southern Fried Records]

DJ mixes 
 RA.316 [Resident Advisor]
 Fabric 86 [Fabric (London)]

References

Living people
1980 births
Musicians from Bristol
English DJs
DJs from Bristol
English record producers
English electronic musicians
English house musicians
Electronic dance music DJs